Pareumenes is an Afrotropical, Palearctic and Oriental genus of potter wasps.

Species
The following species are classified in the genus Pareumenes:

 Pareumenes acutus Liu, 1941
 Pareumenes australensis Meade-Waldo, 1910
 Pareumenes brevirostratus (Saussure, 1856)
 Pareumenes caffra (Meade-Waldo, 1911)
 Pareumenes carinulata (Spinosa, 1815)
 Pareumenes chinensis Liu, 1941
 Pareumenes imperatrix (Smith, 1857)
 Pareumenes impunctatus Selis, 2016
 Pareumenes intermedius Vecht, 1937
 Pareumenes laevis (Schulthess, 1903)
 Pareumenes laminatus (Kriechbaumer, 1879)
 Pareumenes mochii Giordani Soika, 1938
 Pareumenes nigerrimus Vecht, 1963
 Pareumenes obtusus Liu, 1941
 Pareumenes pilifrons (Kohl, 1907)
 Pareumenes pullatus (Smith, 1863)
 Pareumenes punctatissimus Giordani Soika, 1987
 Pareumenes quadrispinosus (Saussure, 1855)
 Pareumenes sansibaricus (Schulz, 1905)
 Pareumenes steinbachi (Schulthess, 1904)

References

Biological pest control wasps
Potter wasps
Hymenoptera genera